Zonulispira is a genus of sea snails, marine gastropod mollusks in the family Pseudomelatomidae.

Species
Species within the genus Zonulispira include:
 Zonulispira chrysochildosa Shasky, 1971
 Zonulispira crocata (Reeve, 1845)
 Zonulispira grandimaculata (Adams C. B., 1852)
 Zonulispira zonulata (Reeve, 1842)
Species brought into synonymy
 Zonulispira dirce Dall, 1919: synonym of Zonulispira grandimaculata (Adams C. B., 1852)
 Zonulispira sanibelensis Bartsch & Rehder, 1939: synonym of Zonulispira crocata (Reeve, 1845)

References

 P. Bartsch (1950), New West American Turrids. Nautilus, 63 (3): 87-97, plate 6

External links
 
 Bouchet, P.; Kantor, Y. I.; Sysoev, A.; Puillandre, N. (2011). A new operational classification of the Conoidea (Gastropoda). Journal of Molluscan Studies. 77(3): 273-308
 Worldwide Mollusc Species Data Base: Pseudomelatomidae

 
Pseudomelatomidae
Gastropod genera